The Metropolitan Borough of St Helens is a local government district with borough status in Merseyside, North West England. The borough is named after its largest settlement, St Helens but also includes neighbouring towns and villages such as Earlestown, Rainhill, Eccleston, Clock Face, Haydock, Billinge, Rainford and Newton-le-Willows.

The Metropolitan Borough Council is made up of 48 councillors, three representing each of the 16 wards.

History
The Metropolitan Borough was formed on 1 April 1974 as a merger of the former County Borough of St Helens, along with the urban districts of Haydock, Newton-le-Willows and Rainford, and parts of Billinge-and-Winstanley and Ashton-in-Makerfield urban districts, along with part of Whiston Rural District, all from the administrative county of Lancashire.

Between 1974 and 1986 (when it was abolished), the borough council shared functions with Merseyside County Council. After abolition, the functions of this body were in part devolved to the boroughs and in part transferred to ad hoc agencies.

Governance

St Helens Metropolitan Borough Council Composition

Elections to St Helens Metropolitan Borough Council are held in three out of every four years, with one-third of the 48 seats on the council being elected at each election.

The Labour party has had a majority on the council since the first election in 1973, except for a period between the 2004 election and the 2010 election when no party had a majority. This allowed an alliance between the Liberal Democrats and the Conservatives to take control after the 2006 election until Labour regained control in 2010.

Since then Labour has strengthened its position on the council and as of the 2021 election the council is composed of the following councillors:-

Parliamentary constituencies

St Helens North
St Helens South and Whiston

Liverpool City Region Combined Authority
The Metropolitan Borough of St Helens is one of the six constituent local government districts of the Liverpool City Region. Since 1 April 2014, some of the borough's responsibilities have been pooled with neighbouring authorities and subsumed into the Liverpool City Region Combined Authority.

The combined authority has effectively become the top-tier administrative body for the local governance of the city region and the leader of St Helens Metropolitan Borough Council, along with the five other leaders from neighbouring local government districts, take strategic decisions over economic development, transport, employment and skills, tourism, culture, housing and physical infrastructure.

Geography

The borough borders the borough of Knowsley, in the south-west, the district of West Lancashire in the north, the Borough of Wigan in the north-east, and to the south the boroughs of Warrington and Halton.

The St Helens Borough covers roughly 30 km² over an area of soft rolling hills used primarily for agricultural purposes, mainly arable. The highest point in the Metropolitan Borough of St Helens, and the whole of Merseyside, is Billinge Hill, 4.5 miles (7.2 km) north from St. Helens centre. The borough is landlocked with a stream running through, Mill Brook/Windle Brook running through Eccleston and connecting with the (disused) St. Helens Branch/Section of the Sankey Canal in the town centre. 
The centre of St Helens is around 160 feet (50 m) above sea level.

From the top of Billinge Hill the cities of Manchester and Liverpool are visible on a clear day as well as the towns of Bolton and Warrington.

Carr Mill Dam is Merseyside's largest body of inland water, offering picturesque lakeside trails and walks as well as national competitive powerboating and angling events.

The Burgies are two tailings on the site of the old Rushy Park coal mine. They were created by the dumping of toxic chemical waste from the manufacture of glass, they have since been covered with tall grass and woodland.

Demography

Ethnicity

Education

Coat of arms

The coat of arms of St Helens Metropolitan Borough Council was adopted in 1974. The crest above the helmet is that of Lord Newton representing Newton U.D.C. and Haydock U.D.C. The crest is suitably differenced by the inclusion of two red (gules) fleur-de-lys on the body of the ram.

The escutcheon is spilt into quarters by the Black (sable) Cross of Haydock & Eccleston and the Blue (azure) Bars of Parr.
Each quarter contains a different charge:
First Quarter: a saltire couped Gules - representing Ashton and Seneley Green,
Second Quarter: a griffin Sable - representing Rainhill,
Third Quarter: a cross flory - representing Windle,
Fourth Quarter: a cross crosslet fitchy - representing Billinge.

Beneath the escutcheon is a scroll bearing the motto ' Prosperitas in Excelsis ' meaning 'Flourishing Well'.

Twin Town 
St Helens is twinned with:
  Stuttgart, Germany

Freedom of the Borough
The following people, military units and Organisations and Groups have received the Freedom of the Borough of St Helens.

Individuals
 Rt Hon Lord Pilkington of St Helens : 1968.
 Rt Hon Lord Evans of Parkside: 1997.
 Rt Hon Lord Watts of Ravenhead: 13 May 2022.
 James Roby: 12 March 2023.

Military Units
 The Royal Military Police Association (Merseyside Branch): 29 February 2012.

Organisations and Groups
 The St Helens and Knowsley Teaching Hospitals NHS Trust: 13 May 2022.

References

External links
 St. Helens Metropolitan Borough Council
 Earlestown Historical Website
 Newton-le-Willows Historical Website

 
Metropolitan boroughs of Merseyside